refers to a number of related Shinto shrines in Japan dedicated to the kami Ōmononushi. It may refer to:

Ōmiwa Shrine, the main shrine in Sakurai, Nara Prefecture (colloquially known as "Miwa Shrine")
Ōmiwa Shrine (Ichinomiya) in Ichinomiya, Aichi Prefecture
Ōmiwa Shrine (Tochigi) in Tochigi, Tochigi Prefecture

See also
Miwa Shrine (disambiguation)